Kaja Foglio (born January 12, 1970) is a Seattle-based writer, artist, and publisher. Foglio co-won the first Hugo Award for Best Graphic Story in 2009 for Girl Genius, Volume 8: Agatha Heterodyne and the Chapel of Bones, a series which went on to win two more Hugo Awards.

Biography

Early life and education
Born Kaja Murphy in Bellevue, Washington, Kaja was raised in Kirkland, Washington. She graduated from Juanita High School in Kirkland, Washington in 1988. She attended the University of Washington, where she was heavily involved with the local chapter of the Society for Creative Anachronism. She graduated from the University of Washington, and she married Phil Foglio in 1993.

Career
Kaja, with Phil, founded Studio Foglio, LLC in 1995. The studio became the venue for her art prints, many of which have been produced as cards for Magic: The Gathering. Kaja Foglio co-writes and illustrates the webcomic Girl Genius with Phil Foglio. She serves as the chief graphic designer and webmaster for the Studio Foglio and Airship Entertainment websites. Foglio also contributes to other projects, including providing the illustrations Barry Hughart's anthology of The Chronicles of Master Li and Number Ten Ox.

In 2009 the Foglios and their colorist, Cheyenne Wright, won the first Hugo Award for Best Graphic Story, for Girl Genius, Volume 8: Agatha Heterodyne and the Chapel of Bones. In 2010, 2011 they won the Hugo Award for Best Graphic Story again. Having won the Hugo Award for Best Graphic Story for three years running, Kaja, Phil, and Cheyenne announced that, in order to show that the category was a "viable award", they refused nomination for the following year (2012).

Works illustrated
 Cat on the Dovrefjell (1997)
 The Chronicles of Master Li and Number Ten Ox (1998)
 Magic: The Gathering trading cards
 Shadowfist trading cards

Works co-authored
 What's New with Phil and Dixie (1999) (OCLC )
 Agatha Heterodyne and the Airship City (2001) (OCLC )
 Agatha Heterodyne and the Monster Engine (2002) (OCLC )
 Agatha Heterodyne and the Circus of Dreams (2005) (OCLC )
 Agatha Heterodyne and the Beetleburg Clank (2005) (OCLC )
 Agatha Heterodyne and the Clockwork Princess (2006) (OCLC )
 Agatha Heterodyne and the Golden Trilobite (2007) (OCLC )
 Agatha Heterodyne and the Voice of the Castle (2008) (OCLC )
 Agatha Heterodyne and the Chapel of Bones (2009) (OCLC )
 Agatha Heterodyne and the Heirs of the Storm (2010) (OCLC )
 Agatha Heterodyne and the Guardian Muse (2011) (OCLC )
 Agatha H. and the Airship City (2011) (OCLC )
 Agatha H. and the Clockwork Princess (2012) (OCLC )

References

External links
 Girl Genius: Adventure, Romance, MAD SCIENCE!
 The Biblio-File: Audio interview with Phil and Kaja Foglio; January 27, 2008
 List of Magic the Gathering cards illustrated by Kaja Foglio
 Kaja Foglio's Live Journal
 Cat on the Dovrefjell
 
 

1970 births
Living people
American webcomic creators
Comic book publishers (people)
American female comics artists
Female comics writers
Game artists
Writers from Kirkland, Washington
Writers from Seattle
 
Hugo Award-winning writers
Steampunk writers
University of Washington alumni